Ang Tanging Ina N'yong Lahat is a 2008 Filipino comedy film directed by Wenn V. Deramas and starring Ai-Ai delas Alas and Eugene Domingo. It is the sequel to a 2003 comedy film Ang Tanging Ina. It was released on December 25, 2008, as Star Cinema's official entry to the 2008 Metro Manila Film Festival. The film grossed a total of PHP 204 million and was the all time box office hit in the Philippines until Star Cinema's You Changed My Life beat it. As of April 2009, it grossed  pesos. Ai-Ai delas Alas reprises her role Ina Montecilio. It also stars Eugene Domingo as Rowena, Carlo Aquino as Tri, Alwyn Uytingco as Pip, Shaina Magdayao as Seven, Serena Dalrymple as Cate, Jiro Manio as Shammy and Yuuki Kadooka as Ten-Ten.

Plot
The film begins with Ina Montecillo (Ai-Ai delas Alas) at the funeral of her fourth husband, Eddie (Dennis Padilla). She and her best friend Rowena (Domingo) then work as a stunt doubles for a film directed by her former employer, Bruno. Four of her children are Overseas Filipinos: her eldest, Juan (Agustin), migrated to New Zealand with his girlfriend, Jenny (Abad). Tudis (Valdez) settled in Canada, where she meets her future husband, a house painter, who in Ang Tanging Ina Mo (Last Na 'To) is Troy (Rafael Rosell). Portia/Por (Evangelista) left for India after her breakup with Jeffrey (Prats), and there she joined GMA (Global Missionaries of Asia). Sixto (Acueza) migrated to United Kingdom to work as a nurse.

Of her eight remaining children, Tri (Aquino), is a law student by day and a call centre supervisor at night. Pip (Uytingco), her out gay son still pursues his dream; queuing for what he thought were auditions for PBB, a soldier gave him a bag of rice from what was actually a rolling store called Pila ng Bigasang Bayan. Seven (Magdayao), is the one in charge of her younger sibling and doing household chores. Cate (Dalrymple) has a dignity to stop everything. Shammy (Manio) is doing something bad instead of studying, but he can be a businessman. Her deaf-mute son Ten-ten (Kadooka) is very quiet while her twin daughters Connie and Sweet (Bianca and Janelle Calma) are quite naughty. Ina had her eatery business, which became bankrupt because of Rowena.

On the night of her 46th birthday, she prepared a surprise for her children, but none of them remember. She decides to study in  university as a working student, taking on a series of odd jobs. Her first stint is as a waitress, but gets fired after removing her uniform in front of patrons due to the heat. She next decides to work in an ice plant, but resigns after Rowena visited her. After that, she continues her studies.

Rowena and Ina go to Malacañan Palace to seek employment. They refuse the positions of governess to the Presidential children (thinking it means governor) and chambermaid (thinking it means a selector of chandeliers), they get jobs as maids. They catch a glimpse of President Hillary Dafalong (Díaz), and they scramble to greet her but are stopped by the Presidential Security Group. They try and fail to speak with her several times until Ina eavesdropps on Vice-President Bill Bilyones (Durano) discussing a plot to assassinate Dafalong. At a public function, Ina and Rowena try to inform the President of the plan but faily because of the absent-mindedness of the crowd, and Dafalong is killed. As a result, Ina blows the whistle on Vice-President Bilyones, who immediately calls for a snap election in which he loses to Ina by a landslide.

Settling into her new role as President, Ina makes initial missteps such as implementing extended night classes for children before improving things through measures such as wholesale arrests of traffic violators, utilizing empty plots of land for rice production and securing the nation's oil supply by teaching Arab leaders a rain dance. However, Ina's relations with her family become strained. Tri gets into bad company and gets involved in a series of anomalous dealings. Pip stars in indecent films, while Ina unwittingly puts her signature on what she thinks is a school assignment of Shammy, but is actually an agreement to set up a gambling den near his school. Her twins, Sweet and Connie, are then kidnapped by terrorists after the girls thought they could ease things by leaving the Palace. They eventually retrieve the girls and subdue the terrorists, and Ina then decides to resign after realising the value of her family. Ina hands over the reins of power to her vice president, Ren Constantino (Picache) who accedes as the new president of the Philippines.

On her 47th birthday, Ina wakes up and thinks that her family forgot again. They fete her with a surprise party to also compensate for forgetting her 46th birthday. As the closing credits roll, now-President Constantino roams around her office in the Palace, looking at the official portraits of past presidents. The last portrait shows Ina as President Montecillo, surrounded by her entire family.

Cast
Ina Montecillo (Ai-Ai delas Alas): Ina is the mother of Juan, Tudis, Tri, Por, Pip, Six, Seven, Cate, Shammy, Ten-ten, Connie, and Sweet. She is Rowena's best friend. She loves her children very much, even working several jobs to support them including being a maid in the Palace. She accedes as the sixteenth President of the Philippines after uncovering Vice-President Billiones' role in the murder of President Dafalong and defeating him in the ensuing snap election. As she faces several problems with the Philippine economy, she her family's relationships also begin to erode. In the end, she resigns the presidency, and returns to caring for her family.
Rowena (Eugene Domingo): Rowena is Ina's best friend. She is very supportive of her, and will do anything to make Ina happy. She was also appointed by Ina as Presidential Spokesperson.
Dimitri "Tri" Montecillo (Carlo Aquino): Tri is Ina's third child. He is a university student reading law. Angry that his mother refuses to let him assist her in policy and decree implementation, he joins the opposition wing of the government. In the end, Ina forgives him as he severs his ties with the opposition.
Tirso "Pip" Montecillo (Alwyn Uytingco): Pip is Ina's fifth child. Openly homosexual, Pip is in love with a fellow film actor, with whom he is videotaped flirting with in a cinema; the video is later leaked and causes a scandal. Later on, he discovers that a frustrated Tri had joined the opposition against their mother's government. In the end, Ina forgives him for the video scandal.
Severina "Seven" Montecillo (Shaina Magdayao): Seven is Ina's seventh child. An intelligent girl, she is viewed as "the responsible child", replacing her older sister Tudis' role in the family and Por's role as Jeffrey's girlfriend. When her mother discovers their relationship, she initially separates them, only allowing them to reunite at the end of the film.
Catherine "Cate" Montecillo (Serena Dalrymple): Cate is Ina's eight child. She is now girly and obedient, unlike her tomboyish, rough role in the original film. She also tends to have many habits that need changing, but, according to Ina, there are too many.
Samuel "Shammy" Montecillo (Jiro Manio): Shammy is Ina's ninth child. He is very friendly, but very boastful of his mother's prestige and their life in the Palace. He accidentally sets up an illegal gambling business in his school (College Tele-Karera Enterprise or CTE, a parody of the real-life ZTE-NBN scandal that rocked President Gloria Macapagal Arroyo's government in 2007) after his friends tell him to let him sign it for his mother. In the end Ina forgives him, and he dissolves the business after his expulsion from school.
Martin "Ten-Ten" Montecillo (Yuuki Kadooka): Ten-Ten is Ina's tenth child. He was born deaf-mute, but is very proficient in sign language. It was he who encouraged his mother to become president, and provided her moral support throughout the story.
Connie & Sweet Montecillo (Bianca & Janella Calma): Connie & Sweet are Ina's eleventh and twelfth children. They are twins, and are normally naughty, but very kind to Ina. When they realised their mother laden with problems, they decided to run away and are kidnapped by terrorists, who demand that the Presidential family pay a ransom in exchange for their release. In the end, they were saved by Ina, who delivered a nationwide television broadcast to appeal to the kidnappers' mothers.
President Hillary Dafalong (Gloria Díaz): The fifteenth President of the Philippines, she is very kind and helpful, especially to Ina. She remains distrustful of Vice-President Billiones, who engineers her assassination while she was delivering a public address.
Vice-President Bill Billiones (DJ Durano): Bill is the fifteenth Vice-President of the Philippines, and a member of the opposition. He is the mastermind behind President Dafalong's death, and is later arrested for murder.
Jeffrey (John Prats): Jeffrey was Por's boyfriend. After breaking up with her, he begins to court her younger sister, Seven. As Ina continues to break them up, Seven becomes more interested with their relationship. In the end, they end up dating.
Ren Constantino (Cherry Pie Picache): Ren is Ina's strict yet kindly college teacher who later helps Ina's presidential campaign. Later on, Ina selects appoints her as the sixteenth Vice-President; at the film's end, Ren succeeds Ina as the seventeenth President after the latter resigns.

Sequel

In 2010, the Star Cinema once again brought the third and the last installment of Ang Tanging Ina film series starring Ai-Ai de las Alas, Eugene Domingo, Marvin Agustin, Nikki Valdez and several others including Jon Avila and Rafael Rosell who are the new cast. The film tells the life of Ina after she quit her position as the President of the Philippines without knowing that she is suffering from brain tumor and very afraid to tell it to her children.

Awards

See also
 Ang Tanging Ina (film series)
 Ang Tanging Ina
 Ang Tanging Ina Mo (Last na 'To!)
 Enteng ng Ina Mo

References

External links
 
 

2008 films
2008 comedy films
Films about presidents
Films directed by Wenn V. Deramas
Philippine sequel films
Philippine comedy films
Star Cinema films
2000s Tagalog-language films
Films about terrorism in Asia
2000s English-language films